Another Night is the third album by German Eurodance group Real McCoy (also known as M.C. Sar & The Real McCoy), released on 28 March 1995 in the US and on 8 May 1995 in the UK. The album features the hit singles "Another Night", "Automatic Lover (Call for Love)", "Run Away", "Love & Devotion" and the hit cover version of "Come and Get Your Love".

When "Another Night" had reached No.1 on the Canadian dance charts in March 1994, Arista Records CEO Clive Davis became interested in bringing M.C. Sar & The Real McCoy to the US market. Once a new deal was finalized, the project name was shortened to Real McCoy and "Another Night" was released in the U.S. in the Summer of 1994. The single had peaked at No.3 in the US by November 1994 and had quickly reached Platinum status. The follow-up single release of "Run Away" was also a successful hit in the US reaching Gold status.

Thanks to the success of the two hits, an all new US release of the album release was quickly planned for 1995. The project was officially re-branded as a trio act featuring German rapper Olaf Jeglitza (O-Jay), Patricia Petersen (Patsy) and newcomer Vanessa Mason. The Space Invaders album (the European album released by the project in Summer 1994) was re-titled Another Night. The cover art, imagery and marketing for the album was completely changed to present a lighter romantic tone. Several album tracks featured on Space Invaders were removed. Davis commissioned a new team of producers to write and produce three new covers songs ("Come and Get Your Love", "Ooh Boy", "If You Should Ever Be Lonely (Deep in the Night)") and an original track (Sleeping with an Angel) for the album. The new production team included: Songwriters Billy Steinberg & Rick Noweles, Producer Shep Pettibone and the Lemon Productions team (Per Adebratt, Douglas Carr & Tony Ekman).

Thanks to the promotional efforts of Arista along with the intense popularity of "Another Night" and "Run Away", the album reached double Platinum status and became a mainstream commercial success in 1995. "Come and Get Your Love" was then released as the third Real McCoy single and reached No.1 on the U.S. dance charts. "Automatic Lover (Call for Love)" was also released late in 1995 as a fourth single but saw lesser success peaking at No.52 on the charts. The album track "Love & Devotion" was also released in Europe and Australia as single. It earned gold status in Australia and peaked at No.11 in the United Kingdom.

Critical reception 
Music critic Robert Christgau gave Another Night an A–. Chuck Eddy from Entertainment Weekly wrote, "This Berlin trio has invaded U.S. radio by tap-dancing space-invader-disco synths beneath soul-diva testifying, ”Sprockets”-accented raps, and Martian munchkin chatter. Yet there’s an odd paranoid undercurrent flowing through tunes like ”Run Away” — the best dance-pop here isn’t merely escapist; it’s about escaping." British magazine Music Week gave Another Night 5 out of 5, adding, "The latest leaders in the Euro dance scene come up with an album stacked with potential hits. Huge commercial success awaits this German/US combo who have already reached the US Top 20 with this album."

Track listing

Another Night (1995)

Space Invaders (1994)

Charts

Another Night

Space Invaders

Year-end charts

Certifications

References 

1995 albums
Arista Records albums
Real McCoy (band) albums